L'Intégrale (The whole thing) is a box set by French singer Shy'm. Released in France and Belgium on 25 June 2012 by Warner Music France to celebrate the release of Shy'm's fourth album, Caméléon, it contains Shy'm's first three studio albums and a DVD featuring behind the scenes footage alongside the music videos for some of her biggest hits, such as "Je sais" and "Femme de couleur".

Production
The box set includes the following albums:
 Mes fantaisies (2006)
 Reflets (2008)
 Prendre l'air (2010)

Chart performance
The box set debuted at No. 65 on the French chart on the same week Caméléon debuted at No. 1. It dropped out of the French top 200 after three weeks, before spending four more weeks in the top 200 in the run up to Christmas 2012, buoyed by Christmas sales. The box set was more successful in Belgium, where it débuted at No. 42 on the Wallonian chart and spent sixteen weeks top 200.

Track listing
Mes fantaisies (Disc 1)

Reflets (Disc 2)

Prendre l'air (Disc 3)

Bonus DVD (Disc 4)

Charts

References

External links
 Shy'm Official site
 Shy'm Official MySpace

2012 compilation albums
Shy'm albums
Warner Music France compilation albums